Hi-Fi Rush is a rhythm-based action game developed by Tango Gameworks and published by Bethesda Softworks for the Windows and Xbox Series X/S platforms. It was announced on January 25, 2023 and released worldwide the same day.

The game follows self-proclaimed "future rock star" Chai (voiced by Robbie Daymond in English and Hiro Shimono in Japanese), whose music player is accidentally embedded in his chest during experimental cybernetic surgery, allowing him to sense the rhythm of the world. Labelled a "defect" and hunted by the corporation that transformed him, Chai bands together with new friends to defeat the company's executives and put a stop to their plans. Hi-Fi Rush includes licensed music from bands such as The Black Keys and Nine Inch Nails.

The game received generally favorable reviews upon release from critics.

Gameplay
Hi-Fi Rush is a rhythm-action game where the protagonist Chai, his enemies, and parts of the environment move to the beat. Attacking on rhythm is not required, as actions automatically sync up with the music, but by timing the button presses right the players are rewarded with higher damage output and timing-based combo finishers deal additional damage. A parry move allows players to cancel enemy attacks by pressing the button at the exact moment of attacks. In addition to the beat-em-up action mechanics, there are also rhythm-based minigame elements where players repeat cues in a call-and-response fashion, or press buttons in rhythmic sequence based on on-screen cues.

The game takes place across multiple linear stages, representing various divisions of the antagonist corporation. Each division is based on a particular musical style, and Chai engages in boss battles at various points.

In addition to combat, the game also features some platform game elements, as well as a system of upgrades to unlock new moves, abilities, and perks, which can be purchased with gears, an in-game currency earned in combat or by exploring levels. Permanent upgrades to health and the special meter also appear in stages as collectibles.

Completing the game once unlocks bonus features, such as the ability to revisit past levels and previously inaccessible areas, a new difficulty setting, and Rhythm Tower, a survival mode similar to Bloody Palace from the Devil May Cry series.

Story
Chai, a 25-year old man with a disabled right arm and a dream to become a rockstar, arrives at the Vandelay Technologies campus to volunteer for Project Armstrong, a test program for cybernetic limb replacement. Unaware to Chai, the CEO, Kale Vandelay (Roger Craig Smith / Takehito Koyasu) secretly designates Chai to be a garbage collector for the company’s waste management. As Chai’s limb replacement process is about to begin, Kale throws away Chai’s music player, which accidentally falls into Chai’s chest and embeds with it during the process, causing Chai to feel a musical connection with his surroundings. As a result of the accident caused by Kale’s carelessness, Chai is labeled a defect and the facility's robotic security forces pursue him.

Chai discovers his new arm can deploy an electromagnetic grabber stick, originally meant for garbage collecting, which he uses to fashion a guitar-like weapon. As he searches for a way to escape, he encounters a robotic cat named 808. He is aided by an unseen ally, Peppermint (Erica Lindbeck / Toa Yukinari), who communicates through the robotic cat, and is guided to her hideout. There, she offers to help Chai escape if he agrees to help her investigate a conspiracy behind Project Armstrong. The two form a reluctant alliance.

Soon, Chai helps Peppermint gain access to a Vandelay executive computer, and learn about SPECTRA, an AI-program that uses Vandelay's cybernetic implants as a back-door for mind control. The two hatch a plan to access and shut down SPECTRA by securing passkeys from each of the company's executives, including Kale. As they pursue their targets, they recruit more allies, including the disgruntled and nervous former head of R&D Macaron (Gabe Kunda / Yasuhiro Mamiya) and his blunt psychology robot partner CNMN (pronounced "Cinnamon") (Sunil Malhotra / Hiroyuki Yoshino), and eventually Vandelay's security chief, Korsica (Sarah Elmaleh / Yū Kobayashi), after Kale makes an attempt on her life for discovering SPECTRA's true nature. While exploring a museum of Vandelay Technologies, Peppermint reveals that she is Kale’s sister. She explains that their mother, Vandelay's founder Roxanne (Rahnuma Panthaky / Naoko Kouda), encouraged her to leave home and find her own path, but Peppermint returned after Kale's ascent to CEO because she sensed something was wrong.

As the group pursues Kale, their final target, they encounter Roxanne, but learn she is being controlled by Kale. Kale traps the group and explains that he plans to use Project Armstrong to control users' purchasing habits. Chai frees himself and his allies from the trap and battles Kale. With Kale defeated, they shut down SPECTRA and frees Roxanne from its control. Afterwards, Roxanne is reinstated as CEO of Vandelay Technologies, Peppermint and Chai are offered jobs within the company, and Macaron and Korsica regain their old jobs. Later, Chai and his friends gather to look at the sunset while he practices playing guitar, so that he has a fallback career.

Events after the main story reveal that SPECTRA has begun restarting by itself with the AI appearing to be a replica of Kale. However, SPECTRA is unexpectedly shutdown after a cleaning robot accidentally pulls the power plug. Chai declares the problem solved and leaves a warning note not to touch the plug.

Development
In a March 2022 interview with Famitsu, founder of Tango Gameworks and executive producer Shinji Mikami mentioned that he wants the company to venture outside of the survival horror genre and nurture younger game creators. He also offered the first hints about their next release, stating that the next game by The Evil Within 2 director John Johanas is "the complete opposite of horror."

Johanas later described Hi-Fi Rush as a "dream game" idea he had in his mind since "way, way back." He initially pitched the title to Mikami after completing work on The Evil Within 2 in 2017. After that a small team created an internal demo to help pitch the game to higher ups at Bethesda. The game was inspired by Shaun of the Dead (2004) and other films by Edgar Wright.

Hi-Fi Rush entered production in 2018 in parallel with Ghostwire: Tokyo. As part of the strategy by Bethesda, development was kept quiet, with no public announcement of the game's release. This was, in part, to avoid skepticism and unsure expectations, as the title was a big departure for both the developer and the publisher. After Microsoft's purchase of Bethesda, marketing suggested that Game Pass might offer a solution, by lowering the entry barrier and allowing the game to generate interest by word-of-mouth.

Hi-Fi Rush was announced at Xbox and Bethesda Developer_Direct on January 25, 2023. The game's appearance was intended as a surprise, although the title and logo were leaked online a day prior to the event. After showcasing the trailer and some gameplay footage, Tango Gameworks announced that the game will be releasing on the same day for Windows and Xbox Series X/S.

Music
The game's original soundtrack was created by former Konami composer Shuichi Kobori, former Capcom composer Reo Uratani, and Tango Gameworks' sound designer Masatoshi Yanagi.

Hi-Fi Rush uses ten licensed music tracks throughout the story: "Lonely Boy" by The Black Keys, "1,000,000" and "The Perfect Drug" by Nine Inch Nails, "Free Radicals" by The Flaming Lips, "Inazawa Chainsaw" by Number Girl,  "Fast as You Can" by Fiona Apple, "Invaders Must Die" by The Prodigy, "Wolfgang's 5th Symphony" by Wolfgang Gartner, "Whirring" by The Joy Formidable, and "Honestly" by Zwan. Bethesda Softworks also created an official Spotify playlist with most of these tracks.

To avoid issues such as YouTube copyright strikes, the game includes an option to replace all licensed songs with similar original tracks performed by the band The Glass Pyramids.

Reception

Hi-Fi Rush received "generally favorable" reviews, according to review aggregator Metacritic.

Jordan Middler, from Video Games Chronicle, said that Hi-Fi Rush is "oozing with style and confidence", although there are "repetitive level design and some clunky platforming", scoring with a 4 out of a 5 star rating. Jesse Norris, from XboxEra, praised the combat, calling it sublime, but "can become difficult to read as the screen fills up with utter chaos", scoring it with 9.5 out of 10. Diego Argüello, from Polygon, called its animation gorgeous and Jet Set Radio-esque art style vivid and arresting. Giovanni Colantonio, from Digital Trends, called it "Tango Gameworks' most confident, stylish and surprising project to date". On the other hand, Tyler Colp from PC Gamer found the game promising in its concept but ultimately average in the action genre, and thought its setlist of music was limited and dated.

The game reached 2 million players by March 2023.

Notes

References

External links
 

2023 video games
Action video games
Bethesda Softworks games
Graffiti video games
Hack and slash games
Rhythm games
Prosthetics in fiction
Science fiction video games
Single-player video games
Unreal Engine games
Video games about cyborgs
Video games about robots
Video games about slavery
Video games developed in Japan
Video games with cel-shaded animation
Xbox Series X and Series S games
Windows games
Tango Gameworks games